Piłatka may refer to the following places in Poland:
Piłatka, Lublin Voivodeship (eastern Poland)
Piłatka, Masovian Voivodeship (east-central Poland)
The following place in Florida:
Palatka, Florida

The insect Euphyes pilatka